Della Marie Hann is an American psychologist and research administrator serving as the associate director for extramural research at the Eunice Kennedy Shriver National Institute of Child Health and Human Development.

Early life and education 
Della Marie Hahn is from Gettysburg, Pennsylvania. She completed a B.S. from Catawba College in 1981. In 1986, she earned a Ph.D. in experimental psychology with an emphasis on issues of early child development from the University of Tennessee. Her dissertation was titled Factors that influence the quality of maternal care: a systemic conceptualization. She held a postdoctoral fellowship from the MacArthur Foundation in the department of psychiatry at the Medical Center of Louisiana at New Orleans. There, Hann participated in research related to early socio-emotional development in infants of adolescent mothers.

Career 
Hann joined the National Institutes of Health (NIH) in 1991 as a program officer and chief of the Interpersonal and Family Processes Program within the National Institute of Mental Health (NIMH) Behavioral, Cognitive, and Social Sciences Research Branch. She has since held a variety of leadership roles both within NIMH and the NIH Office of Extramural Research (OER), including senior policy advisor in OER and director of the Office of Science Policy, Planning and Communications at NIMH. There, Hann led and directed programs on science policy and program evaluation, strategic planning, scientific disease coding and analysis, and internal and external communications and dissemination. Hann served as associate director for research training and scientific collaborations with the NIMH Division of Mental Disorders, Behavioral Research, and AIDS.

Starting in 2008, Hann was acting OER deputy director, while at the same time serving as the acting director for the NIMH Office of Autism Research Coordination at the National Institute for Mental Health (NIMH). In that capacity, she provided leadership and management for the congressionally mandated Interagency Autism Coordinating Committee (IACC). She led the IACC's first national strategic plan. In 2010, she was appointed deputy director of OER.

In 2015, Hann became the associate director for extramural research at the Eunice Kennedy Shriver National Institute of Child Health and Human Development (NICHD). She serves at the director of NICHD's principal advisor on extramural scientific and policy issues.

Selected works

References 

Living people
Year of birth missing (living people)
Place of birth missing (living people)
National Institutes of Health people
21st-century American scientists
21st-century American women scientists
American medical researchers
Women medical researchers
Medical administrators
20th-century American women scientists
American women psychologists
20th-century American psychologists
University of Tennessee alumni
21st-century American psychologists
Catawba College alumni
People from Gettysburg, Pennsylvania
Scientists from Pennsylvania